Nabao Lake (}, is a  ecotourism site situated in Barangay Santa Rita, adjacent to Barangay San Carlos in the Municipality of Cabiao, Nueva Ecija, Philippines. The lake is situated near a mountain called Mount Arayat, which is in a nature park. It is composed of several restaurants, food and handicraft stall shops, guest rooms, a zipline, and a hanging bridge in the center of the lake. It used to be an active fishing site.

References

 

Landforms of Nueva Ecija
Lakes of the Philippines
Tourist attractions in Nueva Ecija